The 2013 European Women Basketball Championship, commonly called EuroBasket Women 2013, was the 34th regional championship held by FIBA Europe. The competition was held in France from 15–30 June 2013. This was the fourth time that the EuroBasket Women has been hosted by France.

Spain defeated France 70–69 in the final to win the title.

Venues

Qualified teams

The Qualifying Round was held from June 12 to July 14, 2012.

Squads

Group draw
The draw took place on September 21, 2012 at 16:30 local time at Paris, France.

Seedings
The seeding was announced on September 18, 2012.

Draw

Preliminary round
The schedule was announced on 5 November 2012.

All times are local (UTC+2).

Group A

|}

Group B

|}

Group C

|}

Group D

|}

Main round

Group E

|}

Group F

|}

Knockout stage

Bracket

5th–8th place bracket

Quarterfinals

5th–8th place semifinals

Semifinals

Seventh place game

Fifth place game

Third place game

Final

Statistical leaders

Points

Rebounds

Assists

Blocks

Steals

All-star team

Final ranking

|-bgcolor=ccffcc
|||align=left|||9||9||0||661||518||+143||18
|-bgcolor=ccffcc
|||align=left|||9||8||1||630||489||+141||16
|-bgcolor=ccffcc
|||align=left|||9||7||2||592||484||+108||14
|-bgcolor=ccffcc
|4||align=left|||9||5||4||593||636||−43||10
|-
|colspan=10 height=1px bgcolor=lightgrey|
|-bgcolor=ccffcc
|5||align=left|||9||5||4||527||480||+47||10
|-bgcolor=ccffcc
|6||align=left|||9||4||5||537||580||−43||8
|-
|7||align=left|||9||4||5||583||612||−29||8
|-
|8||align=left|||9||3||6||566||613||−47||6
|-
|colspan=10 height=1px bgcolor=lightgrey|
|-
|9||align=left|||6||3||3||391||419||−28||6
|-
|10||align=left|||6||2||4||374||390||−16||4
|-
|11||align=left|||6||1||5||413||448||−35||2
|-
|12||align=left|||6||1||5||349||424||−75||2
|-
|colspan=10 height=1px bgcolor=lightgrey|
|-
|13||align=left|||3||1||2||201||211||−10||2
|-
|14||align=left|||3||1||2||200||226||−26||2
|-
|15||align=left|||3||0||3||151||193||−42||0
|-
|16||align=left|||3||0||3||180||225||−45||0
|}

 Teams are qualified for the 2014 FIBA World Championship for Women & EuroBasket Women 2015

References

External links

 FIBA Europe site

 
2013
EuroBasket 2013
EuroBasket Women
EuroBasket Women 2013
Sport in Vannes
June 2013 sports events in Europe
2012–13 in French basketball
Sport in Lille